Tappa Hisar is an archaeological site located in Iran near Damghan. Expeditions in 1931-32 by the University of Pennsylvania and 1956 by the University of Tokyo revealed that the site was inhabited from 3900 to 1900 BC. Evidence was uncovered of pottery-making and metallurgy. A large Sasanian Empire palace was also uncovered.

References

Archaeological sites in Iran